Atkinson Hall is a historic building located at 108 West Main Street in Geneseo, Illinois. The Geneseo Collegiate Institute, a Presbyterian college preparatory school that opened in 1884, built the building in 1892 for its music department. Architect J.E. Hosford designed the building in the Romanesque Revival style. The front of the red brick building faces north and has a pyramidal tower at its corners, with the northeast tower roughly  taller than the northwest one. The main entrance and many of the building's windows are arched, a key feature of Romanesque architecture. The building served the college until it closed in 1922; four years later, it became the American Legion Hall, Shearer Post #350.

The building was listed on the National Register of Historic Places on November 28, 2003.

References

National Register of Historic Places in Henry County, Illinois
Cultural infrastructure completed in 1892
Clubhouses on the National Register of Historic Places in Illinois
Romanesque Revival architecture in Illinois
School buildings on the National Register of Historic Places in Illinois